The Persian-language magazine Nashriya-i Madrasa-i Mubaraka-i Dar al-Funun-i Tabriz (نشریه مدرسه مبارکه دارالفنون تبریز; DMG: Našrīya-i Madrasa-i Mubāraka-i Dār al-Funūn-i Tabrīz) was published in Tabriz from 1893 to 1894. It was printed monthly in a total of four issues. In terms of content, the journal was specialised in distributing topics like the technical production and the economy of Tabriz.

References

External links
 Online-Version: Našrīya-i Madrasa-i Mubāraka-i Dār al-Funūn-i Tabrīz

1893 establishments in Iran
1894 disestablishments in Iran
Defunct magazines published in Iran
Magazines established in 1893
Magazines disestablished in 1894
Mass media in Tabriz
Monthly magazines published in Iran
Persian-language magazines
Qajar Iran